Orthonevra nobilis is a species of hoverfly.

Description
External images
For terms see Morphology of Diptera
Wing length 4-5 ·75 mm. White marks on face extend narrowly downwards. Pterostigm dark brown or black. Antennomere 3 pointed Female tergite 5 with a small incision at hind margin.
van der Goot (1981) figures the male genitalia. The larva is described and figured by Maibach and Goeldlin (1994).

See references for determination.

Distribution
Palearctic Range: Central Fennoscandia, South to Central Spain. Ireland, East North Europe and
Central Europe and North Italy. East into Yugoslavia, Greece and Turkey European Russia and the Caucasus, the Russian Far East, Siberia and North China.

Biology
Habitat: Streams in Fagus woodland, riparian gallery forest, springs and flushes in fen and raised bog. Flowers visited include white umbellifers, Fragaria, Galium, Potentilla erecta, Ranunculus.
The flight period is May/ to August.The larva is associated with springs and flushes, where it occurs in wet, organically-enriched mud.

References

Diptera of Europe
Eristalinae
Insects described in 1817
Taxa named by Carl Fredrik Fallén